The 5ifth Column is the fifth album by Acumen Nation. "Margasuck" and "Tone Deaf" are remixed tracks from Strike 4.

Track listing
 "Monster Zero" – 1:56
 "Parasite Mine" - 3:47
 "Just a Bastard" - 4:31
 "Liquid Hater" - 4:25
 "C-Cection" - 5:33
 "Margasuck" - 3:04
 "Dirty Fighter" - 3:28
 "Demasculator" - 5:45
 "Recaster" - 3:48
 "Rally and Sustain" - 6:05
 "Knowing This..." - 5:08
 "Wraith of Calixto" - 7:51
 "Tone Deaf" - 5:49
 "Mothra" - 2:58
 "Liquid Hater (Acucrack Remix)" - 6:38

All music and lyrics written by Jason Novak.

Personnel
Jason Novak – vocals, guitars, programming, bitching
Jamie Duffy – guitars, programming, erotica
Eliot Engelman – bass guitar, patience
Dan Brill – drums, inflatables, comedy
Ethan Novak - drums on tracks 6 & 13

References

2002 albums
Acumen Nation albums